Norman Houston is the name of:

Norman O. Houston, American businessman
Norman Houston (diplomat), Northern Irish diplomat
Norman Houston (screenwriter), American screenwriter